The Airbus MAVERIC (Model Aircraft for Validation and Experimentation of Robust Innovative Controls) is an experimental blended wing body (BWB) unmanned aerial vehicle.  It was built as a demonstrator for a possible full-scale BWB airliner. Airbus claims that this design can reduce up to 20% of fuel.

Design and development 
According to an Airbus press release, development of the MAVERIC began in 2017 as part of the AirbusUpNext research program.  The MAVERIC is a radio-controlled aircraft and has a wingspan of 3.2 meters.  Power is provided by two engines mounted over the rear of the aircraft, with each having a vertical stabilizer, creating a twin tail arrangement.

Operational history 
The MAVERIC made its first flight in June 2019 at an undisclosed location in France.  The public reveal of the aircraft took place on February 11, 2020, at the Singapore Airshow, where it was announced that the research program would continue until the second quarter of that year.

On September 21, 2020, Zero Emissions Day, Airbus revealed three concepts for the hydrogen-powered Airbus ZEROe; the largest of which being a blended wing aircraft based on the MAVERIC.

Specifications (MAVERIC)

See also

References 

Airbus aircraft
Blended wing body
2010s international experimental aircraft
International unmanned aerial vehicles
Twinjets